William Barnet Neill (b 1930) was Archdeacon of Dromore from 1985 to 1997.

Neill was born in Drumbeg and educated at Trinity College, Dublin.  He was ordained in 1964 and his first post was a curacy  at Dundonald.  He was the incumbent of Drumgath from 1972 to 1980;  Drumgooland from 1976 to 1980; Mount Merrion from 1980 to 1983; and of Dromore Cathedral from 1983 until his retirement in 1997.

Notes

Alumni of Trinity College Dublin
Archdeacons of Dromore
21st-century Irish Anglican priests
20th-century Irish Anglican priests
1930 births
Living people